Going Off the Menu is an American series that premiered on Bravotv.com on April 18, 2016. The six-part digital series features underground chef Russell Jackson and food documentarian Liza deGuia as they visit various underground restaurants in Los Angeles to explore the "most surprising underground and exclusive foodie experiences". The second season of the show premiered on May 8, 2017, with chef Graham Elliot joining the show.

The series is the first Bravo show that is released only on digital platforms.

Episodes

References

External links

 
 

2010s American reality television series
2016 American television series debuts
2016 American television series endings
Bravo (American TV network) original programming
English-language television shows
Television shows filmed in Los Angeles
Food reality television series